John Penkestone (died by 1422), of Southampton, was an English politician.

Family
Little is known of Penkestone's family. He married a woman named Joan, at some point before 1392. Nothing more is recorded of Joan, or of Penkestone's family. It is unknown whether they had children or who inherited his estates when he died, at some point by 1422 when a claim was made no one of his properties, and it is recorded that he was deceased.

Career
He is thought to have been a merchant and owned several properties in Southampton.

He was a Member (MP) of the Parliament of England for Southampton in 1386, 1394 and 1406.

References

14th-century births
15th-century deaths
English MPs 1386
English MPs 1394
Members of the Parliament of England for Southampton
English MPs 1406